In differential topology, an area of mathematics, a neat submanifold of a manifold with boundary is a kind of "well-behaved" submanifold.

To define this more precisely, first let

 be a manifold with boundary, and

Then  is said to be a neat submanifold of  if it meets the following two conditions:
That is, .

More formally,  must be covered by charts  of  such that  where  is the dimension  For instance, in the category of smooth manifolds, this means that the embedding of  must also be smooth.

See also
Local flatness

References

Differential topology